Second Youth is a 1924 American silent romantic comedy film produced by Distinctive Pictures (George Arliss) and distributed through Goldwyn Pictures. The film is one of the few and rare silent appearances of Broadway husband and wife team Alfred Lunt and Lynn Fontanne.

Plot
As described in a film magazine review, Roland Francis, a timid silk salesman, is much sought after by the ladies, but he avoids them. A sub-deb, a stenographer, an extremely modern miss, and, worst of all, Mrs. Benson, a very experienced widow, are all trying to land him in the matrimonial net. The latter, having disposed of three husbands, wants to grab Francis for a fourth trial, and is naturally the hardest of the lot to evade. Anne Winton decides that a young woman has the right to flirt whenever and with whomever she pleases, and selects Francis as her victim. Anne, stimulated by the gibes of a sportive brother-in-law, invites Francis out to supper, takes him in Bohemian circles, lures him under the white lights, and gives him a heck of a time, generally speaking. The result is that he falls genuinely in love with her and not even his ingrained bashfulness is a strong enough barrier to save him from traveling the path to the marriage goal. Anne is brought to realize that she has started something she cannot stop. Still, Francis is hampered by other women and their indignant suitors. After many adventures, he eludes his pursuers and weds Anna.

Cast

Preservation
Prints of Second Youth are held in the collections of Cinematheque Royale de Belgique in Brussels and the Library of Congress.

References

External links

Lobby posters of Second Youth; #1 poster,#2 poster
Second Youth at TheGreatStars.com; Lost Films Wanted (Wayback Machine) (film is not lost)
Lantern slide

1924 films
American silent feature films
Films directed by Albert Parker
Films based on American novels
Goldwyn Pictures films
1924 romantic comedy films
American black-and-white films
American romantic comedy films
1920s American films
Silent romantic comedy films
Silent American comedy films